Torben Schmidt Grael (born 22 July 1960) is one of the most well known Brazilian sailors, renowned in international competitions. A descendant of Danes, he was taken sailing by his grandfather at the age of five years on the sailboat Aileen, of the 6 Metre class, which was the boat used by the silver medal winning 1912 Summer Olympics Danish sailing team. Once he moved to Niterói, he started sailing with his brother, Lars Grael, also an Olympic medal winner, on the Bay of Guanabara. He is father of Olympic champion Martine Grael.

Record
Nicknamed Turbine for his fame in conducting sailboats, he collected five Olympic medals, four of them in the Star class.

He is the Brazilian with the highest number of Olympic medals, and holds the highest number of Olympic medals in sailing together with Ben Ainslie and Robert Scheidt with five, followed by Paul Elvstrøm with four. He also placed first place in many World, South American and Brazilian championships in several categories. His first-mate is usually Marcelo Ferreira.

Grael has also sailed in other international competitions including the 2005–06 Volvo Ocean Race as skipper of the Brasil 1 team, the first 100% Brazilian outfit to enter the competition, which finished third overall. He would win the next Ocean Race, but this time as the skipper of the Swedish team Ericsson 4 (he won the race with two legs to spare). In October 2008 the yacht Ericsson 4 officially travelled 596.6 nautical miles in 24 hours, establishing a 24-hour monohull record. Skipper Torben Grael and his crew made the record on the first leg of the 2008–2009 Volvo Ocean Race. They sailed Ericsson 4 hard as a strong cold front hit the fleet, bringing winds approaching 40 knots, and propelling the yacht at an average speed of 24.8 knots.

He has sailed in several America's Cup races, including the winning campaign in Louis Vuitton Cup in 2000 and the 2007 event as tactician aboard Luna Rossa Challenge

Results – Dinghy Sailing

International

Source

References

External links
 
 
 
 
 

1960 births
Living people
2000 America's Cup sailors
2003 America's Cup sailors
2007 America's Cup sailors
Brazilian male sailors (sport)
Brazilian people of Danish descent
Brazilian people of Polish descent
Extreme Sailing Series sailors
ISAF World Sailor of the Year (male)
Luna Rossa Challenge sailors
Medalists at the 1984 Summer Olympics
Medalists at the 1988 Summer Olympics
Medalists at the 1996 Summer Olympics
Medalists at the 2000 Summer Olympics
Medalists at the 2004 Summer Olympics
North American Champions Soling
Olympic bronze medalists for Brazil
Olympic gold medalists for Brazil
Olympic medalists in sailing
Olympic sailors of Brazil
Olympic silver medalists for Brazil
Sailors at the 1984 Summer Olympics – Soling
Sailors at the 1988 Summer Olympics – Star
Sailors at the 1992 Summer Olympics – Star
Sailors at the 1996 Summer Olympics – Star
Sailors at the 2000 Summer Olympics – Star
Sailors at the 2004 Summer Olympics – Star
Snipe class junior world champions
Snipe class world champions
South American Champions Soling
Sportspeople from São Paulo
Star class world champions
Volvo Ocean Race sailors
World champions in sailing for Brazil
World Sailing officials
Torben Grael
Pan American Games gold medalists for Brazil
Pan American Games bronze medalists for Brazil
Pan American Games medalists in sailing
Sailors at the 1983 Pan American Games
Sailors at the 1987 Pan American Games
Medalists at the 1983 Pan American Games
Medalists at the 1987 Pan American Games